The 1949 Women's European Volleyball Championship was the first edition of the event, organised by Europe's governing volleyball body, the Confédération Européenne de Volleyball. It was hosted in Prague, Czechoslovakia from 10 to 18 September 1949.

Participating teams

Format
The tournament was played in a single round-robin format, with all teams placed in a single group.

Group and matches

|}

|}

Final ranking

References
 Confédération Européenne de Volleyball (CEV)

External links
 Results at todor66.com

European Volleyball Championships
Volleyball Championship
V
Women's European Volleyball Championships
Women's European Volleyball Championship, 1949
Women's European Volleyball Championship
Women's volleyball in Czechoslovakia
Sports competitions in Prague